Royal Khmer Airlines was a small airline based in Phnom Penh, Cambodia. It operated scheduled passenger services out of Phnom Penh International Airport and Angkor International Airport.

History 
Finally, Royal Khmer Airlines acquired aging Boeing 737-200, which was put in service on 15 May 2004, and subsequently started scheduled passenger operations. These services proved to be unreliable and during much of 2005, the airline was inoperative. In November 2011, the airline was shut down.

Fleets
Royal Khmer Airlines had 04 fleets and all are Boeing 737-200 such as XU-RKA, XU-RKB, XU-RKC, XU-RKH

Destinations
Royal Khmer Airlines published its last flight timetable in late 2006, which listed the following scheduled destinations:
 - Cambodia
Phnom Penh (Pochentong International Airport)
Siem Reap (Angkor International Airport)
 - Korea, South
Seoul (Incheon International Airport)
 - Vietnam
Hanoi (Noi Bai International Airport)
Ho Chi Minh City (Tan Son Nhat International Airport)

References

External links

Official website

 Defunct airlines of Cambodia
 Airlines established in 2000
 Airlines disestablished in 2007
Cambodian companies established in 2000